The Stargate is an album by Norwegian solo artist Mortiis that was scheduled for release with the book Secrets of My Kingdom, alongside a limited gold press version of the CD, which was for unknown reasons later released in 2001, prior to The Smell of Rain. The LP was a 3-sided gatefold with a 12" fold-out lyric sheet. The fourth side was etched. Initially there was to be a large poster, however this was dropped by the record label. There was going to be a reprint of this CD, but it never happened.

Track listing
"Child of Curiosity & the Old Man of Knowledge" - 5:33 (Mortiis)
"I am the World" - 6:18 (Mortiis)
"World Essence" - 5:58 (Trane)
"Across the World of Wonders" - 6:42 (Mortiis)
"(Passing by) an Old and Raped Village" - 5:09 (Trane)
"Towards the Gate of Stars" - 7:45 (Mortiis)
"Spirit of Conquest/the Warfare" - 9:16 (Mortiis)
"Army of Conquest/the Warfare (Ever Onwards)" - 13:04 (Trane)

Personnel
Sarah Jezebel Deva: Female Lead Vocal
Kalle Metz: Male Lead Vocal, Additional Backing Vocal
Mortiis: Keyboards, Synthesizers, Backing Vocal
Niklas Trane: Acoustic Guitars

Production
Arranged By Mortiis
Produced, Recorded, Engineered & Mixed By Mortiis, Niklas Trane & Conny Larsson
Mastered By Mortiis

Reissue
 Earache Records reissued the CD as part of a 3-CD set, along with Født til å Herske and Crypt of the Wizard. Remastered by Mortiis and repackaged in a deluxe embossed slipcase. It came included with liner notes by Tommy Udo.

References

Mortiis albums
1999 albums
Earache Records albums